Yehuda Fuchs (born 10 April 1969) is an Israeli major general who commanded the Gaza Division of Israel Defense Forces.

Military career
Fuchs was drafted into the IDF in 1987. He volunteered as a paratrooper in the Paratroopers Brigade. He served as a soldier and a squad leader. He became an infantry officer after completing Officer Candidate School. Afterwards he transferred to the Nahal Brigade and served as a platoon leader and as a company commander. 

Fuchs led the Brigade's Anti-tank company in counter-guerrilla operations in South Lebanon, commanded a Nahal battalion in counter-terror operations in the Second Intifada. Later he commanded Judea Regional Brigade, IDF's Officer Candidate School and the Nahal Brigade. In 2014 he was appointed head of the Paratroopers and Infantry Corps, and in 2016, commander of the Gaza Division. 

In 2019 he was appointed IDF's next military attaché in the United States.

In February 2021 it was announced that Fuchs would replace the outgoing commander of the IDF Central Command sometime in the summer of 2021.

References

1969 births
Israeli generals
Living people
Israeli Jews
Israeli military personnel